Chyorny Klyuch is a rural locality (a selo) in Nikolayevsky Selsoviet, Beloretsky District, Bashkortostan, Russia. The population was 29 as of 2010. There is 1 street.

Geography 
Chyorny Klyuch is located 43 km northeast of Beloretsk (the district's administrative centre) by road. Makhmutovo is the nearest rural locality.

References 

Rural localities in Beloretsky District